Rudolf Rabl JUDr (23 March 1889, Jindřichův Hradec, Bohemia - 20 August 1951, Newcastle, England) was a Czech lawyer and part of the Czechoslovak government-in-exile in London during the Second World War. In Prague, Rabl was a special advisor to the Czechoslovak Ministry of Finance. He commentated of legal affairs. Livia Rothkirchen described Rabl as being a member of "the cream of the cultural elite" in Europe. 

Rabl studied law at various universities including Charles University in Prague. In 1933, Rabl acted on behalf of German Jews wishing to escape Germany for Czechoslovakia. Being Jewish, Rabl fled Czechoslovakia because of Nazi persecution and was given the name "Dr Jur Rudolf Israel Rabl" by the Nazis in documents. His property was confiscated.  

Rabl had Communist sympathies.

References 

1889 births
1951 deaths
People from Jindřichův Hradec
Czech Jews
Czechoslovak lawyers
People from the Kingdom of Bohemia
Charles University alumni
Jewish emigrants from Nazi Germany to the United Kingdom